Rozella is a genus of fungi. 

Rozella may also refer to:

Rozella, Central Province, a village in Sri Lanka
Rozella Lake, pen name of Roberta Leigh, British author
Rozella M. Schlotfeldt (1914–2005), American nurse, educator, and researcher
Rozella B. Smith (1911–1987). American herpetologist and data archivist and analyst

See also
 
Rosella (disambiguation)
Rossella (disambiguation)
Rozelle (disambiguation)